Moonlighting may refer to:

 Side job, a job taken in addition to one's primary employment

Entertainment
 Moonlighting (film), a 1982 drama film by Jerzy Skolimowski
 Moonlighting (TV series), 1985–1989 American television series, starring Bruce Willis and Cybill Shepherd
 "Moonlighting" (theme song), from the above TV series, performed by Al Jarreau
 Moonlighting (soundtrack), the soundtrack to the television series
 "Moonlighting" (NCIS), a television episode
 Moonlighting (The Rippingtons album), 1986
 Moonlighting: Live at the Ash Grove, an album by Van Dyke Parks, 1998
 Moonlighting: The Anthology, an album by Roger Daltrey, 2005
 "Moonlighting" (Leo Sayer song), 1975

See also 
 Protein moonlighting, or gene sharing, a phenomenon by which a protein can perform more than one function
 Unreported employment, sometimes referred to as "moonlighting"
 Moonlight (disambiguation)
 Moonlighter (disambiguation)